The 1994 Miller Genuine Draft 400 was the 14th stock car race of the 1994 NASCAR Winston Cup Series season and the 26th iteration of the event. The race was held on Sunday, June 19, 1994, in Brooklyn, Michigan, at Michigan International Speedway, a two-mile (3.2 km) moderate-banked D-shaped speedway. The race took the scheduled 200 laps to complete. In the final laps of the race, Penske Racing South driver Rusty Wallace would manage to come back from a slow pit stop, passing the leader with five to go in the race. Wallace would be able to hold onto the lead to take his 36th career NASCAR Winston Cup Series victory, his fifth victory of the season, and his third consecutive victory. To fill out the top three, Richard Childress Racing driver Dale Earnhardt and Roush Racing driver Mark Martin would finish second and third, respectively.

Background 

The race was held at Michigan International Speedway, a two-mile (3.2 km) moderate-banked D-shaped speedway located in Brooklyn, Michigan. The track is used primarily for NASCAR events. It is known as a "sister track" to Texas World Speedway as MIS's oval design was a direct basis of TWS, with moderate modifications to the banking in the corners, and was used as the basis of Auto Club Speedway. The track is owned by International Speedway Corporation. Michigan International Speedway is recognized as one of motorsports' premier facilities because of its wide racing surface and high banking (by open-wheel standards; the 18-degree banking is modest by stock car standards).

Entry list 

 (R) denotes rookie driver.

Qualifying 
Qualifying was split into two rounds. The first round was held on Friday, June 17, at 3:30 PM EST. Each driver would have one lap to set a time. During the first round, the top 20 drivers in the round would be guaranteed a starting spot in the race. If a driver was not able to guarantee a spot in the first round, they had the option to scrub their time from the first round and try and run a faster lap time in a second round qualifying run, held on Saturday, June 18, at 11:00 AM EST. As with the first round, each driver would have one lap to set a time. For this specific race, positions 21-40 would be decided on time, and depending on who needed it, a select amount of positions were given to cars who had not otherwise qualified but were high enough in owner's points; up to two provisionals were given. If needed, a past champion who did not qualify on either time or provisionals could use a champion's provisional, adding one more spot to the field.

Ten drivers would fail to qualify.

Full qualifying results

Race results

Standings after the race 

Drivers' Championship standings

Note: Only the first 10 positions are included for the driver standings.

References 

1994 NASCAR Winston Cup Series
NASCAR races at Michigan International Speedway
June 1994 sports events in the United States
1994 in sports in Michigan